A promyelocyte (or progranulocyte) is a granulocyte precursor, developing from the myeloblast and developing into the myelocyte.  Promyelocytes measure 12-20 microns in diameter. The nucleus of a promyelocyte is approximately the same size as a myeloblast but their cytoplasm is much more abundant. They also have less prominent nucleoli than myeloblasts and their chromatin is more coarse and clumped. The cytoplasm is basophilic and contains primary red/purple granules.

Additional images

References

External links
  - "18. Bone Marrow and Hemopoiesis:  bone marrow smear, promyelocyte and erythroblasts "
  "Bone marrow"
  "Bone marrow"
 "White Cell Basics: Maturation" at virginia.edu
  - "Bone marrow smear"
 

Blood cells
Leukocytes